2TV  is a Lithuanian television channel owned and operated by LNK. It broadcasts 24 hours a day.
It was launched in November 19th, 2007, and it was the second music channel in Lithuania. It did not get any design changes after 2013, it remained the same, did not have an HD channel like most other channels from LNK do in 2018.
in 2020, the name was changed to 2TV.

References

External links
www.2tv.lt

Television channels in Lithuania
Television channels and stations established in 2002
Television channels and stations disestablished in 2004
Television channels and stations established in 2007